Allen "Jubilee" Dunbar (born May 17, 1947) is a former American football wide receiver who played two seasons in the National Football League with the New Orleans Saints and Cleveland Browns. He was drafted by the San Francisco 49ers in the third round of the 1972 NFL Draft. He played college football at Southern University and attended Washington High School in Lake Charles, Louisiana. Dunbar was also a member of the Philadelphia Bell of the World Football League.

References

External links
Just Sports Stats
WFL profile

Living people
1946 births
Players of American football from New Orleans
American football wide receivers
Southern Jaguars football players
New Orleans Saints players
Cleveland Browns players
Philadelphia Bell players